Goliath's End is the second EP by In Legend, a band from vocalist and pianist Bastian Emig, mostly known as the drummer from the German a cappella metal band Van Canto.

This can be downloaded for free from the band's website.

Track listing

Personnel 
In Legend
Bastian Emig – choir conductor, composer, engineering, drums, mixing, piano, producer, sound design, synthesizer
Daniel Galmarini – piano
Daniel Schmidle – keytar, piano, composer, engineer, mixing, sound design, engineer, design
Paul Perlejewski – bass guitar
Daniel Wicke – bass guitar
Marcos Feminella – drums
Dennis Otto – drums, choir

Guest musicians
Helga Bieser – choir
Melanie Bohlend – choir
Martina Böhmer – choir
Benni Cellini (Letzte Instanz) – cello
Laura Vargas Contador (ex-Sacramento, Inferno Doll) – choir
Alexandra Frerichs – choir
Vanessa Gerlich – choir
Eva Glaser – choir
Glonner Chorbuben – children’s choir (conducted by Martin Danes)
Teresa Heiser – choir
Sharon Horen – choir
Fiona Horn – choir
Angela Igl – choir
Eva Kühn – choir
Henriette Mittag – viola
Michael Müller – choir
Martin Panse – choir
Vanessa Schambil – choir
Wendy Schulz – choir
Sabrina Schwabtz – choir
Sarah Schwarz – choir
Melanie Uhl – choir
Niels Löffler (Orden Ogan) – choir
Sebastian “Seeb” Levermann (Orden Ogan) – engineer, choir

Crew
Martin Danes – choir conductor
Juan Pablo Donoso – engineer
Andrea Friedrich – photography
Glönn – artwork
Jamie Kam – artwork
Bastian Ködel – engineer
Jürgen Lusky – engineer, mastering, mixing, sound design
Jan Sauerssig – engineer
Jonas Schria – engineer

References 

2015 albums
In Legend albums